Dysentery bush is a common name for several Australian plants and may refer to:

Alyxia buxifolia
Grewia latifolia, endemic to Northern and Eastern Australia
Grewia retusifolia